Pa Tần may refer to several places in Vietnam:

 Pa Tần, Điện Biên, a rural commune of Nậm Pồ District
 , a rural commune of Sìn Hồ District

See also
Pa Tan (disambiguation)